Joseph Michael Scanlan (19 March 1900 – 23 April 1969) was an Australian rules footballer who played with South Melbourne in the VFL during the 1920s.

Scanlan was a defender and captained South Melbourne in 1928, 1930 and 1931. He represented Victoria 6 times in interstate football.

References

External links

1900 births
Australian rules footballers from Victoria (Australia)
Sydney Swans players
Leopold Football Club (MJFA) players
1969 deaths